Mozambique competed at the 2012 Summer Olympics in London, from 27 July to 12 August 2012. This was the nation's ninth consecutive appearance at the Olympics. In the weeks before the Games, Mozambique athletes trained at Comberton Village College in Cambridge.

The Mozambique National Olympic Committee sent the nation's largest delegation to the Games since the 1992 Summer Olympics in Barcelona. A total of 6 athletes, 4 men and 2 women, competed in athletics, boxing, judo, and swimming. Track hurdler Kurt Couto, who was considered Mozambique's best medal prospect at the Olympics, reprised his role as the nation's flag bearer for the third consecutive time. Mozambique, however, again failed to win a single Olympic medal.  They have not won an Olympic medal since the 2000 Summer Olympics in Sydney, where middle-distance runner Maria Mutola became the nation's first ever Olympic champion.

Athletics

Mozambique athletes have so far achieved qualifying standards in the following athletics events (up to a maximum of 3 athletes in each event at the 'A' Standard, and 1 at the 'B' Standard):

Men

Women

Boxing

Mozambique has so far qualified boxers for the following events

Men

Judo

Mozambique has qualified 1 judoka.

Swimming

Mozambique has gained two "Universality places" from the FINA.

Men

Women

References

External links
 
 

Nations at the 2012 Summer Olympics
2012
Summer Olympics